Phyllidia is a genus of sea slugs, dorid nudibranchs, shell-less marine gastropod molluscs in the family Phyllidiidae.

Species
Species in the genus Phyllidia include:

 Phyllidia alyta  Yonow, 1996
 Phyllidia babai  Brunckhorst, 1993
 Phyllidia carlsonhoffi  Brunckhorst, 1993
 Phyllidia coelestis  Bergh, 1905
 Phyllidia elegans  Bergh, 1869
 Phyllidia exquisita  Brunckhorst, 1993
 Phyllidia flava  Aradas, 1847
 Phyllidia goslineri  Brunckhorst, 1993
 Phyllidia guamensis (Brunckhorst, 1993)
 Phyllidia haegeli (Fahrner & Beck, 2000)
 Phyllidia koehleri  Perrone, 2000
 Phyllidia larryi (Brunckhorst, 1993)
 Phyllidia madangensis  Brunckhorst, 1993
 Phyllidia marindica (Yonow & Hayward, 1991)
 Phyllidia multituberculata C.R. Boettger, 1918
 Phyllidia ocellata  Cuvier, 1804
 Phyllidia orstomi  Valdés, 2001 
 Phyllidia picta Pruvot-Fol, 1957
 Phyllidia polkadotsa  Brunckhorst, 1993
 Phyllidia rueppelii (Bergh, 1869)
 Phyllidia scottjohnsoni  Brunckhorst, 1993
 Phyllidia tula  Marcus & Marcus, 1970
 Phyllidia undula  Yonow, 1990 
 Phyllidia varicosa  Lamarck, 1801 - type species of genus Phyllidia
 Phyllidia willani  Brunckhorst, 1993
 Phyllidia zebrina  Baba, 1976

Species brought into synonymy
 Phyllidia albonigra Quoy & Gaimard, 1832: synonym of Phyllidiella pustulosa (Cuvier, 1804)
 Phyllidia alia Yonow, 1984: synonym of Phyllidia coelestis Bergh, 1905
 Phyllidia annulata Gray, 1853: synonym of Phyllidiella annulata (Gray, 1853)
 Phyllidia arabica Ehrenberg, 1831: synonym of Phyllidia varicosa Lamarck, 1801
 Phyllidia aurata Pruvot-Fol, 1952: synonym of Phyllidia flava Aradas, 1847
 Phyllidia baccata Pruvot-Fol, 1957: synonym of Phyllidia ocellata Cuvier, 1804
 Phyllidia bataviae Pruvot-Fol, 1957: synonym of Phyllidiella nigra (van Hasselt, 1824)
 Phyllidia borbonica Cuvier, 1804: synonym of Phyllidia varicosa Lamarck, 1801
 Phyllidia bourgini Risbec, 1928: synonym of Phyllidiella rosans (Bergh, 1873)
 Phyllidia catena Pruvot-Fol, 1956: synonym of Phyllidiella zeylanica (Kelaart, 1859)
 Phyllidia dautzenbergi Vayssière, 1912: synonym of Phyllidiopsis dautzenbergi (Vayssière, 1912)
  Phyllidia depressa  Aradas, 1847 : synonym of Phyllidia flava Aradas, 1847
 Phyllidia gemmata Pruvot-Fol, 1957: synonym of Phyllidiopsis gemmata (Pruvot-Fol, 1957)
 Phyllidia empelia Yonow, 1984: synonym of Phyllidiella striata (Bergh, 1889)
 Phyllidia fasciolata Bergh, 1869: synonym of Phyllidia varicosa Lamarck, 1801
 Phyllidia honloni Risbec, 1956: synonym of Phyllidia varicosa Lamarck, 1801
 Phyllidia japonica Baba, 1937: synonym of Phyllidia ocellata Cuvier, 1804
 Phyllidia loricata Bergh, 1873: synonym of Phyllidiopsis loricata (Bergh, 1873)
 Phyllidia meandrina Pruvot-Fol, 1957: synonym of Phyllidiella meandrina (Pruvot-Fol, 1957)
 Phyllidia mediocris Yonow & Hayward, 1991: synonym of Phyllidiella striata (Bergh, 1889)
 Phyllidia melanocera Yonow, 1986: synonym of Phyllidiella pustulosa (Cuvier, 1804)
 Phyllidia menindie (Brunckhorst, 1993): synonym of Phyllidia picta Pruvot-Fol, 1957
 Phyllidia monacha Yonow, 1986: synonym of Phyllidiopsis dautzenbergi (Vayssière, 1912)
 Phyllidia multifaria  Yonow, 1986: synonym of Phyllidia elegans Bergh, 1869
 Phyllidia nigra van Hasselt, 1824: synonym of Phyllidiella nigra (van Hasselt, 1824)
 Phyllidia nigra Pease, 1868: synonym of Phyllidiella rosans (Bergh, 1873)
 Phyllidia nobilis Bergh, 1869: synonym of Phyllidiella pustulosa (Cuvier, 1804)
 Phyllidia papillosa Aradas, 1847: synonym of Phyllidia flava Aradas, 1847
 Phyllidia pulitzeri Pruvot-Fol, 1962: synonym of Phyllidia flava Aradas, 1847
 Phyllidia pustulosa  Cuvier, 1804 : synonym of Phyllidiella pustulosa (Cuvier, 1804)
 Phyllidia quinquelineata Blainville, 1816: synonym of Phyllidia varicosa Lamarck, 1801
 Phyllidia rolandiae Pruvot-Fol, 1951: synonym of Phyllidia flava Aradas, 1847
 Phyllidia rosans Bergh, 1873: synonym of Phyllidiella rosans (Bergh, 1873)
 Phyllidia rotunda Eliot, 1904: synonym of Phyllidiella pustulosa (Cuvier, 1804)
 Phyllidia schupporum  Fahrner & Schrödl, 2000 : synonym of Phyllidia elegans Bergh, 1869
 Phyllidia serenei Risbec, 1956: synonym of Phyllidiella nigra (van Hasselt, 1824)
 Phyllidia sereni [sic]: synonym of Phyllidiella nigra (van Hasselt, 1824)
 Phyllidia seriata Pruvot-Fol, 1957: synonym of Phyllidiella zeylanica (Kelaart, 1859)
 Phyllidia sinaiensis Yonow, 1988: synonym of Phyllidiopsis sinaiensis (Yonow, 1988)
 Phyllidia soria Er. Marcus & Ev. Marcus, 1970: synonym of Phyllidiella rosans (Bergh, 1873)
 Phyllidia spectabilis Collingwood, 1881: synonym of Phyllidiella pustulosa (Cuvier, 1804)
 Phyllidia sudanensis Heller & Thompson, 1983: synonym of Phyllidiella annulata (Gray, 1853)
 Phyllidia trilineata Cuvier, 1804: synonym of Phyllidia varicosa Lamarck, 1801
 Phyllidia tuberculata Baba, 1930: synonym of Phyllidia ocellata Cuvier, 1804
 Phyllidia tuberculata Risbec, 1928: synonym of Phyllidiopsis cardinalis Bergh, 1876
 Phyllidia verrucosa van Hasselt, 1824: synonym of Phyllidiella pustulosa (Cuvier, 1804)
 Phyllidia xishaensis Lin, 1983: synonym of Phyllidiopsis xishaensis (Lin, 1983)
 Phyllidia zeylanica Kelaart, 1859: synonym of Phyllidiella zeylanica (Kelaart, 1859)

References

Phyllidiidae
Gastropod genera
Taxa named by Georges Cuvier